Chamalal (also called Camalal or Chamalin) is an Andic language of the Northeast Caucasian language family spoken in southwestern Dagestan, Russia by approximately 500 ethnic Chamalals. It has three quite distinct dialects, Gadyri, Gakvari, and Gigatl.

History
Chamalal is spoken in southwestern Dagestan, Russia by indigenous Chamalals since the 8th or 9th century. The ethnic population is approximately 5,000, with around 500 speakers. The language has a 6b (threatened) status.

Geographic distribution
The approximately 500 ethnic speakers live in eight villages in the Tsumadinsky District on the left bank of the Andi-Koisu river in the Dagestan Republic and in the Chechnya Republic. The speakers are mostly Muslim, primarily following Sunni Islam since the 8th or 9th century.

Official status
There are no countries with Chamalal as an official language.

Dialects/Varieties
Chamalal has three distinct dialects: Gadyri (Gachitl-Kvankhi), Gakvari (Agvali-Richaganik-Tsumada-Urukh), and Gigatl (Hihatl). There are also two more dialects: Kwenkhi, Tsumada.

Derived languages
Gigatl (Hihatl) and Chamalal proper (with Gadyri, Gakvari, Tsumada and Kwenkhi dialects) are considered to be sublanguages.

Writing System 
Chamalal is an unwritten language. Avar and Russian are used in school, and Avar is also used for literary purposes.

Bibliography 
 Anderson, S. (2005). Language, 81(4), 993-996. 
 Back Matter. (1996). Historische Sprachforschung / Historical Linguistics, 109(2).
 Blažek, V. (2002). The ‘beech’-argument — State-of-the-Art. Historische Sprachforschung / Historical Linguistics, 115(2), 190-217.
 Friedman, V. (2005). The Slavic and East European Journal, 49(3), 537-539.
 Greppin, J. (1996). New Data on the Hurro-Urartian Substratum in Armenian. Historische Sprachforschung / Historical Linguistics, 109(1), 40-44.
 Harris, A. (2009). Exuberant Exponence in Batsbi. Natural Language & Linguistic Theory, 27(2), 267-303.
 Haspelmath, M. (1996). Language, 72(1), 126-129. 
 Kolga, M., Tõnurist, I., Vaba, L., & Viikberg, J. (1993). The Red book of the Peoples of the Russian Empire.
 Magomedova, P. T. (2004). Chamalal. The Indigenous Languages of the Caucasus Vol. 3, The North East Caucasian Languages, Vol. 1, 3-65.
 Schulze, W. (2005). Grammars for East Caucasian. Anthropological Linguistics, 47(3), 321-352.
 Szczśniak, A. (1963). A Brief Index of Indigenous Peoples and Languages of Asiatic Russia. Anthropological Linguistics, 5(6), 1-29.
 Tuite, K., & Schulze, W. (1998). A Case of Taboo-Motivated Lexical Replacement in the Indigenous Languages of the Caucasus. Anthropological Linguistics, 40(3), 363-383.
 Voegelin, C., & Voegelin, F. (1966). Index of Languages of the World. Anthropological Linguistics,8(6), I-222.

References

Further reading 
 

Northeast Caucasian languages
Andic languages
Languages of Russia
Endangered Caucasian languages